Sun Zhen (5 February 1892 – 9 September 1985) was a General of the National Revolutionary Army during the Second Sino-Japanese War and Chinese Civil War.

Biography
In 1933 he was made a General commanding the Garrison of Sichuan's Northwestern District. After the outbreak of the war with Japan, in 1938 he was made acting Commander in Chief of the 22nd Army Group, Sun simultaneously he held the command of the 41st Corps which he retained until 1940.  His command fought in the Battle of Xuzhou, defending to the north of Taierzhuang between Xuecheng and Tengxian, in Shandong.

In 1939 he became the Commander in Chief of 22nd Army Group which he commanded until 1945. His forces fought in the Battle of Suixian-Zaoyang, 1939-40 Winter Offensive, Battle of Zaoyang-Yichang, Central Hopei Operation, and in 1945 he was Commander in Chief Western Henan Central Force during the Battle of West Henan-North Hubei.

References
 Hsu Long-hsuen and Chang Ming-kai, History of The Sino-Japanese War (1937–1945) 2nd Ed., 1971. Translated by Wen Ha-hsiung, Chung Wu Publishing; 33, 140th Lane, Tung-hwa Street, Taipei, Taiwan Republic of China.

External links
  The Generals of WWII:Sun Zhen

1892 births
1985 deaths
People of the Northern Expedition
Chinese people of World War II
National Revolutionary Army generals from Sichuan
People from Deyang
Taiwanese people from Sichuan